Serge Moléon Blaise (born 1951) is a Haitian painter. Born in Cap-Haïtien, Blaise paints scenes from Haitian history, especially battle scenes. His younger brothers, Fabolon and Saint-Louis, are also noted painters of the region.

References
 

1951 births
Haitian male painters
Living people
People from Cap-Haïtien
20th-century Haitian painters
20th-century Haitian male artists
21st-century Haitian male artists
21st-century painters